Pseudocypraea adamsonii is a species of sea snail, a marine gastropod mollusk in the family Ovulidae, one of the families of cowry allies. The epithet adamsonii commemorates John Adamson.

References 

Pediculariinae
Gastropods described in 1832